, better known by his stage name , is a Japanese actor and singer.

Biography
Santamaria appeared in Kiyoshi Kurosawa's 2003 film Doppelganger. He starred in Katsuyuki Motohiro's 2005 film Negotiator. He directed and starred a segment of the 2008 anthology film R246 Story. He also appeared in Kiyoshi Sasabe's 2011 film The Legacy of the Sun.

Filmography

Film

Television

References

External links
 Official website
 

1971 births
Living people
People from Ōita (city)
20th-century Japanese male actors
21st-century Japanese male actors
20th-century Japanese male singers
20th-century Japanese singers
21st-century Japanese male singers
21st-century Japanese singers